Joe Trinidad Archuleta (September 13, 1905 – 1981) was a Pueblo-American painter and muralist from the Taos Pueblo. Some of his works are in the permanent collection of institutions including the Museum of New Mexico.

Archuleta was from a family of farmers. In 1922 he married Rufina Romero. He became a known painter in the Taos area, sometimes collaborating with other local artists on public murals. In middle age, Archuleta and his wife, Ruffina, spent time at the utopian D. H. Lawrence Ranch with D. H. Lawrence, along with his uncle Tony Luhan, Luhan's wife Mabel Dodge Luhan, and artist Dorothy Brett. A buffalo painting by Archuleta can be found on the west wall of the Lawrence Cabin at the Ranch. The mural depicts He also worked as a ranch hand and trail guide at the ranch.

Collections
Archuleta's work is found in the collection of the Millicent Rogers Museum. He produced a painted mural of buffalo in 1934 for the D.H. Lawrence Ranch.

References 

20th-century American painters
20th-century indigenous painters of the Americas
Native American painters
Taos Pueblo artists
Painters from New Mexico
1905 births
1981 deaths
20th-century Native Americans